Idrissa Akuna Elba  (born 6 September 1972) is an English  actor and DJ. An alumnus of the National Youth Music Theatre in London, he is known for roles including Stringer Bell in the HBO series The Wire (2002–2004), DCI John Luther in the BBC One series Luther (2010–2019), and Nelson Mandela in the biographical film Mandela: Long Walk to Freedom (2013). For Luther, he received four nominations each for a Golden Globe Award for Best Actor and a Primetime Emmy Award for Outstanding Lead Actor, winning one of the former.

Elba appeared in Ridley Scott's American Gangster (2007), Obsessed (2009) and Prometheus (2012). He portrayed Heimdall in the Marvel Cinematic Universe (MCU), beginning with Thor (2011), and Bloodsport in The Suicide Squad (2021), set in the DC Extended Universe. He also starred in Pacific Rim (2013), Beasts of No Nation (2015), for which he received Golden Globe and BAFTA nominations for Best Supporting Actor, and Molly's Game (2017). One of his other prominent roles was that of Rufus Buck in the Western film The Harder They Fall (2021). Elba has also voiced characters in Zootopia, The Jungle Book, Finding Dory (all 2016), and Sonic the Hedgehog 2 (2022). He made his directorial debut in 2018 with an adaptation of the 1992 novel Yardie by Victor Headley.

Apart from acting, Elba performs as a DJ under the moniker DJ Big Driis or Idris and as an R&B singer. In 2016, he was named in the Time 100 list of the Most Influential People in the World.

Early life
Idrissa Akuna Elba was born on 6 September 1972 in the London Borough of Hackney, to Winston Elba, a Sierra Leonean Creole man who worked at the Ford Dagenham plant, and Eve, a Ghanaian woman.  His parents were married in Sierra Leone and later moved to London. Elba was raised in Hackney and East Ham; he shortened his first name to "Idris" at school in Canning Town, where he first became involved in acting. He credits The Stage with giving him his first big break. After seeing an advertisement for a play in it; he auditioned and subsequently met his first agent while performing in the role. In 1986, he began helping an uncle with his wedding DJ business; within a year, he had started his own DJ company with some of his friends.

Elba briefly attended Barking and Dagenham College, leaving school in 1988 and winning a place in the National Youth Music Theatre after a £1,500 Prince's Trust grant. In order to support himself between roles in his early career, he worked in odd jobs including tyre-fitting, cold-calling, and night shifts at Ford Dagenham. He was worked in nightclubs under the DJ nickname "Big Driis" during his adolescence, but began auditioning for television roles in his early twenties.

Career

Television
Elba's first acting role was in Crimewatch murder reconstructions and in 1994 he appeared in a BBC children's drama called The Boot Street Band. In 1995, he landed his first significant role on a series called Bramwell, a medical drama set in 1890s England. He played a central character in an episode of Season 1, an African petty thief named Charlie Carter, who lost his wife to childbirth and had to figure out how to support his newborn daughter. His first named role arrived earlier in 1995, when he was cast as a gigolo on the "Sex" episode of Absolutely Fabulous. Many supporting roles on British television followed, including series such as The Bill and The Ruth Rendell Mysteries. He joined the cast of the soap opera Family Affairs and went on to appear on the television serial Ultraviolet and later on Dangerfield. He decided to move to New York City soon afterwards. He returned to England occasionally for a television role, such as a part in one of the Inspector Lynley Mysteries. In 2001, Elba played Achilles in a stage production of Troilus and Cressida in New York City.

In 1997 he starred in the first two episodes of series 2 “Blood, Sweat and Tears” in Silent Witness.

After a supporting turn on a 2001 episode of Law & Order, Elba landed a starring role on the 2002 HBO drama series The Wire. From 2002 to 2004, Elba portrayed Russell "Stringer" Bell in the series, perhaps his best-known role in the United States. In 2005, he portrayed Captain Augustin Muganza in Sometimes in April, an HBO film about the Rwandan genocide. Elba appeared on the 2007 BET special Black Men: The Truth. He appeared as Charlie Gotso on The No. 1 Ladies' Detective Agency, filmed in Botswana. The series premiered on 23 March 2008, Easter Sunday, on BBC One, receiving a high 6.3 million viewers and 27% of the audience share.

In January 2009, Variety reported that Elba would portray Charles Miner, a new rival to Dunder Mifflin regional manager Michael Scott (Steve Carell) for NBC's The Office. Elba appeared in a six-episode story arc later in the 2009 season as well as the season finale.
In September 2009, he signed a deal to star as the lead role on the six-part BBC television series Luther, which aired in May 2010. He appeared on Showtime's The Big C in 2010. At the 69th Golden Globe Awards telecast on 15 January 2012, Elba won the Award for Best Actor in a Series, Mini-Series, or Motion Picture Made for Television for his role on the BBC crime thriller series Luther.

In April 2018, it was announced that Elba was cast as Charlie in the Netflix comedy series, Turn Up Charlie. It premiered on 15 March 2019 and was cancelled after one season. He also created and starred in the semi-autobiographical comedy In the Long Run.

Films

In 2007, Elba signed on to play the lead role of the film Daddy's Little Girls, playing Monty, a blue-collar mechanic who falls in love with an attorney helping him gain custody of his kids, and finds the relationship and his custody hopes threatened by the return of his former wife. He appeared in 28 Weeks Later (2007) and This Christmas (2007), which brought in nearly $50 million at the box office in 2007. In 2008, he starred in the horror film Prom Night and the Guy Ritchie London gangster film RocknRolla. In 2009, he starred in the horror film The Unborn and in Obsessed, a thriller that had him cast opposite Beyoncé. The latter was a box office success, taking $29 million in its opening weekend.

Elba's next film was Legacy (2010), in which he portrayed a black ops soldier who returns to Brooklyn after a failed mission in Eastern Europe, where he has undertaken a journey looking for retribution. He starred in Dark Castle's adaptation of DC/Vertigo's The Losers, under the direction of Sylvain White, in the role of Roque, the second-in-command of a black-ops team out for revenge against a government that did them wrong. Filming took place in Puerto Rico and the movie was released in April 2010. Elba appeared in the thriller Takers (2010). He played Heimdall in Kenneth Branagh's film Thor (2011) (based on the Marvel Comics superhero of the same name).

In August 2010, Elba signed up to portray the title character in a reboot of James Patterson's Alex Cross film franchise. However in February 2011, he was replaced by Tyler Perry. In Ghost Rider: Spirit of Vengeance (2011), the sequel to Ghost Rider (2007), Elba played an alcoholic warrior monk tasked with finding the title character. In February 2012, Elba confirmed that he would portray Nelson Mandela in the film Mandela: Long Walk to Freedom, which is based on his autobiography. As part of his preparation for the role, Elba spent a night locked in a cell alone on Robben Island, where Mandela had been imprisoned. His performance earned him a nomination for the Golden Globe Award for Best Actor – Motion Picture Drama.

In June 2012, Elba portrayed the role of Captain Janek in Ridley Scott's Prometheus. He joined the cast of the film Pacific Rim (2013) in the role of Stacker Pentecost. He reprised his role as Heimdall in Thor: The Dark World in 2013. In January 2014, he confirmed that he would be starring in a film adaptation of Luther. In 2014, he starred in No Good Deed as a vengeful psychopathic serial killer.

In 2015, Elba appeared as Heimdall in the superhero blockbuster Avengers: Age of Ultron, directed by Joss Whedon. Elba also starred alongside Abraham Attah in the film Beasts of No Nation which premiered in select theatres and on Netflix. He earned a Golden Globe Award nomination for Best Performance by an Actor in a Supporting Role in any Motion Picture as well as a BAFTA Award nomination for Supporting Actor in the Film category. In 2016, he had several voice roles: the cape buffalo chief of police, Chief Bogo, in Disney's Zootopia, alongside Ginnifer Goodwin and Jason Bateman; villainous tiger Shere Khan in The Jungle Book (2016), a live-action adaptation of the animated 1967 film of the same name, directed by Jon Favreau; and sea lion Fluke in Pixar's Finding Dory, alongside Ellen DeGeneres and Albert Brooks, both reprising their roles from Finding Nemo (2003). Also that year, he played the main antagonist, Krall, in the sequel Star Trek Beyond.

In 2017, he played Roland Deschain in the Stephen King film adaptation The Dark Tower, starred in The Mountain Between Us and Aaron Sorkin's directorial debut Molly's Game, alongside Jessica Chastain. In 2019, Elba starred as the villain in Fast & Furious Presents: Hobbs & Shaw, a spin-off of Fast & Furious franchise, and played Macavity in Tom Hooper's film adaptation of Andrew Lloyd Webber's musical, Cats. In 2021, Elba portrayed mercenary Robert "Milton" DuBois / Bloodsport in James Gunn's The Suicide Squad. In 2022, Elba was the voice of Knuckles in the film Sonic the Hedgehog 2, a sequel to the film Sonic the Hedgehog which is itself based on the franchise of the same name. He will reprise the role in a self-titled solo series for Paramount+ in 2023.

Music

Elba has appeared in music videos for Fat Joe (2002), Angie Stone (2004), and rapper Giggs (2010). In 2006, he recorded the four-song EP Big Man for Hevlar Records. He co-produced and performed on the intro to Jay-Z's album American Gangster (2007). He DJed at the 2007 NBA All Star parties at The Venetian and Ice House Lounge in Las Vegas.

In July 2009, Elba was the DJ for BET's current series Rising Icons. He announced the release of his first single "Please Be True." In the August 2009 issue of Essence magazine, he announced the name of his six-song EP as Kings Among Kings. He released his EP High Class Problems Vol. 1 in the United Kingdom in February 2010, for which he has won many prizes including a Billboard Music Awards nomination.

In 2011, he performed on the intro to Pharoahe Monch's album W.A.R.. In the following year he co-directed and performed in the Mumford & Sons music video for "Lover of the Light".

In 2014, he produced K. Michelle's "The Rebellious Soul Musical" which debuted on VH1 on 19 August 2014. In May, Elba featured on Mr Hudson's single "Step Into the Shadows". Mr Hudson also produced his album Idris Elba Presents mi Mandela, which was released in November 2014. He also featured on the remix of Ghanaian music group, VVIP's single "Selfie" together with Nigerian rapper Phyno released on 12 September 2014 and video released on YouTube on 11 April 2015.

Elba performed a rap for the second album by Noel Fielding and Sergio Pizzorno's band, the Loose Tapestries. Elba also rapped in a remix of Skepta's "Shutdown" which was uploaded on 1 June 2015 to SoundCloud. On 17 August, a song was released on which Elba appeared on Nigerian singer D'banj's single "Confidential", featuring Sierra Leonean rapper Shadow Boxer with the video uploaded to YouTube on 20 August. In November 2015, Elba opened for Madonna during her Rebel Heart Tour in Berlin, Germany. Elba is also featured on the Macklemore & Ryan Lewis album This Unruly Mess I've Made (2016).

In July 2018, he launched his record label, 7Wallace Music. Elba performed at Coachella Valley Music and Arts Festival in April 2019. In 2019, he featured on the track "Boasty" by British grime artist Wiley. Elba also appears in the "Boasty" music video, delivering his verse in a mansion that includes a film set. In 2019, Elba appears on Taylor Swift's song "London Boy" from her seventh studio album Lover. The intro of the song samples a snippet from an interview by Elba. In April 2020, Elba collaborated with producer Jay Robinson on the track "Know Yourself", released on Mau5trap.

In 2020, after hearing Canadian R&B singer Emanuel's debut single "Need You", Elba reached out with an idea for a music video compiled from clips of people sharing the things that were helping them cope with the COVID-19 pandemic. Elba was credited as creative director of the video, and is being credited as an executive producer of Emanuel's forthcoming full-length debut album.

On 13 February 2021, Elba performed a guest DJ mix for Mix Up on Australian national youth broadcaster Triple J. On 22 September 2021, Elba announced he would be releasing a collaborative EP with Australian pop rock duo Lime Cordiale titled Cordi Elba, which was released on 14 January 2022. Elba also collaborated with Paul McCartney on a remix of McCartney's song "Long Tailed Winter Bird."

Other works

In October 2014, Elba presented the series Journey Dot Africa with Idris Elba on BBC Radio 2, exploring all types of African music. Elba was featured in various television commercials for Sky box-sets in 2013, 2014, 2015, 2016, and 2019. He has collaborated with the Uk parliament in their efforts to eradicate Ebola from West Africa, working alongside the UK Secretary of State for International Development Justine Greening in 2014. Elba has created a collaboration with British fashion label Superdry, which launched at the end of November 2015.

In January 2016, Elba addressed the UK parliament in regards to the concern of the lack of diversity on screen. He said, 'Change is coming but it's taking its sweet time', He spoke about the lack of diversity regarding race, gender, and sexuality.

Elba hosted The Best FIFA Football Awards 2017 at the London Palladium on 23 October 2017. During the show he took a selfie of "the best team in the world" which included Lionel Messi, Cristiano Ronaldo, and Neymar.

He had the idea to develop the music from his album Idris Elba Presents mi Mandela into a show, which eventually resulted in a play called Tree that premiered at the Manchester International Festival in 2019. However, authorship of the piece was disputed. On 2 July 2019, The Guardian published a story describing how writers Tori Allen-Martin and Sarah Henley claimed to have been removed from the production under what they described as questionable circumstances. The two writers had worked on the project for four years following an approach from Elba asking them to develop his idea for a musical based on the album, on which Allen-Martin had also collaborated. Kwame Kwei-Armah joined the project in May 2018 and rewrote part of their material. At the time of its premiere Tree was billed as "created by Idris Elba and Kwame Kwei-Armah". Allen-Martin and Henley described their creative input as having included research and script-writing, as well as coming up with the play's title, and that after being removed they were threatened with legal action if they went public with the story. Elba and Kwei-Armah both published rebuttals of the writers' account of what happened on Twitter.

He currently signed a deal with Apple to produce original content through his Green Door Pictures production company. In January 2021, it was reported that the companies of Elba and his wife, Sabrina Dhowre, would be developing an Afrofuturist adult animated, and sci-fi, series, tentatively titled Dantai, for Crunchyroll, which would be about a time when biotech has "created an ever-widening gap between the haves and have-nots."

Elba will portray the character Solomon Reed in the Phantom Liberty downloadable expansion for CD Projekt Red's 2020 video game Cyberpunk 2077. He provides voice acting and his likeness to the character.

Kickboxing
Discovery Channel produced a documentary, Idris Elba: Fighter, chronicling Elba's 12-month kickboxing and mixed martial arts training under Muay Thai coach Kieran Keddle, culminating in Elba's first professional kickboxing fight—and win—against Lionel Graves, a younger, more experienced Dutch opponent, at London's York Hall.

Personal life
Elba has been married three times: first to Hanne "Kim" Nørgaard (from 1999 to 2003) and then to Sonya Nicole Hamlin (for four months in 2006). He has two children: a daughter with Nørgaard and a son with former girlfriend Naiyana Garth. Elba began a relationship with Somali-Canadian model Sabrina Dhowre in early 2017. They became engaged on 10 February 2018, during a screening of his film Yardie at an East London cinema. They were married on 26 April 2019 in Marrakesh.

Elba has stated he is spiritual but not religious. He is an avid Arsenal supporter. In 2015, as part of his Discovery Channel miniseries Idris Elba: No Limits, he broke the land speed record for the Pendine Sands "Flying Mile" course.

The Prince's Trust, a UK youth charity founded by Prince Charles in 1976, which Elba credits with helping begin his career, appointed him as their anti-crime ambassador in April 2009. He voiced support for a vote to remain in the European Union for the 2016 United Kingdom European Union membership referendum.

On 16 March 2020, Elba said he and his wife had tested positive for COVID-19 amidst the pandemic.  During his quarantine period, he noted that he had suffered from asthma all his life, placing him in the high-risk category of the disease.

Awards and honours

In 2013, Elba was named Essences annual Sexiest Man of the Year and, in 2018, he was named People magazine's Sexiest Man Alive. In October 2014, he was presented with a MOBO Inspiration Award.

Elba was appointed an Officer of the Order of the British Empire (OBE) in the 2016 New Year Honours for services to drama. In 2017, he won the male title for the "Rear of the Year" award in Britain.

In September 2018, he was one of 50 people named for "making London awesome" and helping to shape London's cultural landscape, as part of Time Out magazine's 50th anniversary. In the 2020 and 2021 editions of the Powerlist, he was listed in the top 100 most influential people in the UK of African/African-Caribbean descent.

Select filmography

 One Love
 Obsessed
 Thor
 Prometheus
 Pacific Rim
 Thor: The Dark World
 Mandela: Long Walk to Freedom
 Zootopia
 The Jungle Book
 The Dark Tower 
 The Mountain Between Us 
 Thor: Ragnarok
 Fast & Furious: Hobbs & Shaw
 The Suicide Squad
 Sonic the Hedgehog 2
 Beast 
 Three Thousand Years of Longing

Discography
Albums
 2015: Murdah Loves John (The John Luther Character Album)

Extended plays
 2006: Big Man
 2009: Kings Among Kings
 2010: High Class Problems Vol. 1
 2014: Idris Elba Presents Mi Mandela
 2022: Cordi Elba (with Lime Cordiale)

Remixes
"Trust in Me"
"The Bare Necessities"

Mixtapes
 2011: Merry DriisMas Holiday Mixtape

Other appearances
 2019: "Even If I Die (Hobbs & Shaw)" on the soundtrack to the Fast & Furious spin-off film Hobbs & Shaw, featuring Cypress Hill; the remix version features Hybrid.
 2019: "London Boy" by Taylor Swift — The intro of the song samples a snippet from an interview by Elba.
 2019: "Party & BullShit" by Sarkodie – He was featured in the song.
 2020: "Fear or Faith Pt. 2" by Future Utopia from the album 12 Questions.
 2021: "Long Tailed Winter Bird (Idris Elba Remix)" by Paul McCartney from the album McCartney III Imagined.

Featured singles

References

External links

 
 
 
 

1972 births
Living people
20th-century English male actors
21st-century English male actors
21st-century English musicians
Best Miniseries or Television Movie Actor Golden Globe winners
Black British male rappers
Black British male actors
Black British DJs
English house musicians
British people of Sierra Leone Creole descent
Club DJs
DJs from London
Electronic dance music DJs
English DJs
English expatriates in the United States
English film producers
English male film actors
English male kickboxers
English male rappers
English male stage actors
English male television actors
English male voice actors
English music video directors
English record producers
English television producers
English people of Ghanaian descent
English people of Sierra Leonean descent
Independent Spirit Award for Best Supporting Male winners
Male actors from London
National Youth Theatre members
NME Awards winners
Officers of the Order of the British Empire
Outstanding Performance by a Male Actor in a Miniseries or Television Movie Screen Actors Guild Award winners
Outstanding Performance by a Male Actor in a Supporting Role Screen Actors Guild Award winners
People from Hackney Central
People from Canning Town
People from East Ham
People of Sierra Leone Creole descent
English people of African-American descent